Ouve-Wirquin is a commune in the Pas-de-Calais department in the Hauts-de-France region of France.

Geography
Ouve-Wirquin lies about 10 miles (16 km) southwest of Saint-Omer, on the junction of the D225 and the D341, the route of the Roman road the Chausée Brunehaut.  The river Aa flows through the commune.

Population

Places of interest
 The church of Notre-Dame, dating from the nineteenth century.
 An eighteenth-century watermill.

See also
Communes of the Pas-de-Calais department

References

Ouvewirquin